456 (Four Five Six) is a music album by electronic artists The Grid which was released in 1992.

Critical reception

Track listing
All tracks composed by Dave Ball and Richard Norris; except where indicated
 "Face the Sun" (Ball, Norris, Sun Ra)  – 6:45 
 "Ice Machine" (Ball, Norris, Dieter Meier)  – 3:45 
 "Crystal Clear" – 4:39
 "Aquarium" – 6:07
 "Instrument" – 0:31
 "Heartbeat" – 4:41
 "Oh Six One" – 0:09
 "Figure of 8" – 5:31
 "Boom!" – 4:14
 "Leave Your Body" – 4:53
 "Fire Engine Red" – 5:24

Personnel
Dave Ball - synthesizer, sampler, vocoder
Richard Norris - drum machine, effects, machines, sampler
with:
Sun Ra - vocals on "Face The Sun"
Dieter Meier - vocals on "Ice Machine"
Zodiac Mindwarp - vocals on "Fire Engine Red"
Robert Fripp - guitar on "Ice Machine" and "Fire Engine Red"
Cobalt Stargazer, Rob Marche - guitar
Alex Gifford - piano, Hammond organ
Andy Mackay - saxophone, oboe
Steve Sidelnyx - percussion
Michele Oldland, P.P. Arnold, Dagmar Krause - backing vocals
Malcolm Garrett, Norman Hathaway - sleeve design

References

External links
 .

1992 albums
The Grid albums
Virgin Records albums